Crystallodytes is a genus of sandburrowers native to the Pacific Ocean.

Species
There are currently three recognized species in this genus:
 Crystallodytes cookei Fowler, 1923 (Cooke's Sandburrower)
 Crystallodytes enderburyensis Schultz, 1943 (South Pacific sandburrower)
 Crystallodytes pauciradiatus J. S. Nelson & J. E. Randall, 1985 (Rapanui sandburrower)

References

Creediidae
Marine fish genera
Taxa named by Henry Weed Fowler